Bolshoye Marinkino is a rural locality (a village) in Andreyevskoye Rural Settlement, Alexandrovsky District, Vladimir Oblast, Russia. The population was 6 as of 2010.

Geography 
Bolshoye Marinkino is located 15 km southeast of Alexandrov (the district's administrative centre) by road. Maloye Marinkino is the nearest rural locality.

References 

Rural localities in Alexandrovsky District, Vladimir Oblast
Alexandrovsky Uyezd (Vladimir Governorate)